Zdeněk Sklenář is a retired Czechoslovak slalom canoeist who competed in the late 1960s. He won a silver medal in the C-2 team event at the 1969 ICF Canoe Slalom World Championships in Bourg St.-Maurice.

References

Czechoslovak male canoeists
Living people
Year of birth missing (living people)
Medalists at the ICF Canoe Slalom World Championships